Elza Radziņa (1917, Kharkiv, Russian Empire — 2005, Riga, Latvia) was a Soviet Latvian theater and cinema actress, master of the spoken word (reader). She received award of People's Artist of the USSR in 1976 and Order of the Three Stars in 1995.

She studied in Jelgava theater studio in 1942. After the World War II worked in Jelgava Drama theater (1945-1953). For a brief moment she worked in Valmiera Drama theater, but from 1954 worked in Latvian National Theater, where she became one of the leading actresses.

In 1949 she made her debut in biographical drama film "Rainis" from Riga Film Studio.

Work

Stage 

 1958: Filumēna Martorano as Filumēna
 1962: Mīļais Melis as Stella Kempbela
 1969: Vasara Noānā as baroness Orora Didevāna
 1971: Lilioms as Muškātne
 1972: Paši pūta, paši dega as Auguste Biezais
 1975: Fedra as Fedra
 1980: Mērnieku laiki as Annuža
 1987: Lampu drudzis as Dotija Otlija
 1990: Bezkaunīgie veči as Zuzanna Bertolde
 1996: Zaļā zeme as Līču māte
 1998: Pilnos auļos as Diāna Vrīlande

Filmography 

Hamlet (1964) as Gertrude
Purva bridējs (1996) as madam Horst. 
Viimne reliikvia (1969) as Abtiss
The Devil's Servants (1970) as Gertrude
King Lear (1971) as Goneril
The Devil's Servants at the Devil's Mill (1972) as Gertrude
Oļegs un Aina (1973) as Aina's mother
The Favorite (1976) as Auntie Debb Penn
Death by Sailing (1976) as Mrs. Tufts
Teātris (1978) as Dolly

References

External links
 

1917 births
2005 deaths
Soviet film actresses
Soviet stage actresses
Latvian film actresses
Latvian stage actresses
20th-century Latvian actresses
Recipients of the Order of Friendship of Peoples
People's Artists of the USSR
Spoken word artists
Burials at Forest Cemetery, Riga